Ichizo Konishi (born 15 March 1939) is a Japanese former tennis player.

A left-handed player, Konishi was born in Osaka and grew up in Mie Prefecture. He attended Tokyo's Rikkyo University and in 1961 became their first student athlete to win the intercollegiate championships.

Konishi, who reached the singles third round of the 1965 French Championships, debuted for the Japan Davis Cup team in 1965 and featured in 12 singles rubbers across four campaigns during his career.

In 1966 he was All Japan champion for the only time (over Koji Watanabe in the final) and finished runner-up to Davis Cup teammate Osamu Ishiguro at the Asian Games in Bangkok.

See also
List of Japan Davis Cup team representatives

References

External links
 
 
 

1939 births
Living people
Japanese male tennis players
Asian Games gold medalists for Japan
Asian Games silver medalists for Japan
Asian Games medalists in tennis
Medalists at the 1966 Asian Games
Tennis players at the 1966 Asian Games
Sportspeople from Osaka